Tyakal Nanjundiah Venkataramana (born 1958) is an Indian mathematician who specialises in  algebraic groups and automorphic forms.

He was awarded the Shanti Swarup Bhatnagar Prize for Science and Technology in 2001, the highest science award in India, in the mathematical sciences category. Venkataramana's first major work was the extension of G. A. Margulis's work on arithmeticity of higher rank lattices to the case of groups in positive characteristics. He also has contributions to non-vanishing theorems on cohomology of arithmetic groups, to Lefschetz type theorems on restriction of cohomology on locally symmetric spaces and to arithmeticity of monodromy groups.

Other awards/honours
Young Scientist Award (1990)
Birla Award (2000)
ICTP Prize (2000)
Fellow, Indian Academy of Sciences, Bangalore 
Fellow, Indian National Science Academy, 2004
Fellow of the American Mathematical Society, 2012
Speaker at the ARbeitstagung, 1999
Invited Speaker at the ICM, 2010, Hyderabad

References

1958 births
20th-century Indian mathematicians
Indian group theorists
Academic staff of Tata Institute of Fundamental Research
Fellows of the Indian National Science Academy
Fellows of the Indian Academy of Sciences
Fellows of the American Mathematical Society
University of Mumbai alumni
Living people
Scientists from Bangalore
Recipients of the Shanti Swarup Bhatnagar Award in Mathematical Science